Adem Asil (né: Abdelrahman Elgamal; born 21 February 1999) is an Egyptian-born Turkish male artistic gymnast.  He represented Turkey at the 2020 Olympic Games and is the 2022 World Champion on still rings.

Personal life 

Gymnastics career

Representing Egypt

2017 
A member of the Egyptian national team, Elgamal took part in the Paris Challenge Cup in France and the Varna Challenge Cup in Bulgaria.  He later competed at the World Championships in Montreal where he finished 37th in the all-around during qualification and did not advance to any event finals.

Representing Turkey

2018–2020 
Shortly after the 2017 World Championships, Elgamal's coach announced that he was moving to Turkey and invited Elgamal to showcase himself in front of the Turkish national coaches.  They were impressed with "his work ethic, his evident strength, and his unshakable belief in himself" and invited him to train with the Turkish national team.  Elgamal moved to Turkey leaving his parents in Egypt while continuing training gymnastics in Turkey.  After becoming a naturalized citizen in 2019 the International Gymnastics Federation approved his request for nationality change; however it wouldn't take effect until 2020.

He competed for Turkey the first time at the Baku World Cup.  He later was chosen to represent Turkey at the 2020 European Championships in Mersin.  He helped Turkey win silver in the team event.  Additionally he finished fourth on rings and horizontal bar.

2021 
Elgamal began competing under the name Adem Asil in 2021.  At the European Championships Asil finished fifth in the all-around during qualifications and therefore earned an individual Olympic berth to compete at the postponed 2020 Olympic Games.  He suffered an injury during the all-around final and did not finish.  However he competed during the horizontal bar final and won the bronze medal behind David Belyavskiy and Andy Toba.  Asil next competed at the Osijek Challenge Cup and the Doha World Cup, picking up three medals at the former.  At the Olympic Games Asil qualified to the all-around, rings, and vault finals.  He finished fifteenth in the all-around, seventh on rings, and sixth on vault.  Asil finished the year competing at the World Championships where he finished eleventh in the all-around.

2022 

Asil started the year competing at the World Cups in Cottbus, Baku, and Osijek.  He competed at the Mediterranean Games where he helped Turkey win gold in the team event.  Individually Asil won gold in the all-around and on vault, silver on rings and horizontal bar behind İbrahim Çolak and Marios Georgiou respectively, and bronze on floor exercise.  Asil next competed at the Islamic Solidarity Games where he helped Turkey once again win gold in the team event.  Individually he won gold in the all-around and on rings, silver on vault, and bronze on floor exercise.  In August Asil competed at the 2022 European Championships.  On the first day of competition Asil won bronze in the all-around behind Joe Fraser and compatriot Ahmet Önder.  He helped Turkey win bronze in the team event and individually he won silver on rings behind Eleftherios Petrounias.

In September Asil competed at the Paris World Challenge Cup.  He won gold on both vault and rings.

At the World Championships Asil helped Turkey finish eleventh during qualifications – their highest placement in history.  Individually Asil won gold on rings, earning Turkey's second gold medal on the event after İbrahim Çolak in 2019.

Competitive history

References

External links 
 
 
 

1999 births
Living people
Sportspeople from Alexandria
Egyptian male artistic gymnasts
Egyptian emigrants to Turkey
Turkish male artistic gymnasts
Gymnasts at the 2020 Summer Olympics
Olympic gymnasts of Turkey
Mediterranean Games gold medalists for Turkey
Mediterranean Games silver medalists for Turkey
Mediterranean Games bronze medalists for Turkey
Mediterranean Games medalists in gymnastics
Gymnasts at the 2022 Mediterranean Games
World champion gymnasts